Michele Scarponi (25 September 1979 – 22 April 2017) was an Italian road bicycle racer, who rode professionally from 2002 until his death in 2017 for the , Domina Vacanze–Elitron,  and  teams. During his career, Scarponi took 21 professional victories.

Scarponi started cycling at the age of eight with a local team in the Marche region, spending almost a decade with them which culminated in him becoming the winner of the Italian National Road Race Championships for juniors in 1997. For the next decade, Scarponi rode mainly for Italian teams except for his two-year spell with Spanish team  in 2005 and 2006, where he was used as a domestique during Roberto Heras' 2005 Vuelta a España success.

Having returned to the peloton after a doping ban, Scarponi took his first major victories in 2009 with : he won a stage and the general classification at Tirreno–Adriatico and took two stage victories – both from breakaways – at the Giro d'Italia, where he had been deployed as a domestique for Gilberto Simoni's overall challenge. He led the  team at a Grand Tour for the first time at the 2010 Giro d'Italia, where he finished in fourth overall and won a stage for the second successive year.

He then spent three years with the  team between 2011 and 2013; in his first season, he won the Giro del Trentino and initially finished in second place to Alberto Contador at both the Volta a Catalunya and the Giro d'Italia. Contador was later stripped of those results in February 2012, after a positive test for clenbuterol at the 2010 Tour de France – as a consqeuence, Scarponi was promoted to both victories, and he also assumed the victory in the points classification of the Giro d'Italia. He took two further fourth-place overall finishes at the Giro d'Italia in 2012 (losing a podium finish during the final stage individual time trial) and 2013, but no further stage wins. Scarponi joined the  team in 2014, initially serving as a team leader for that year's Giro d'Italia, before often serving in a domestique role for the remainder of his career, in support of his compatriots Vincenzo Nibali and Fabio Aru. In his final professional race, the 2017 Tour of the Alps, Scarponi took his first individual victory for three-and-a-half years.

During his professional career, Scarponi also served two suspensions in relation to doping. He admitted to his involvement in May 2007, following meetings with the Italian National Olympic Committee (CONI) and was suspended from racing until August 2008. Towards the end of 2012, Scarponi served a further three-month ban after his admission to performing medical tests with Michele Ferrari, an Italian doctor whose name has been linked to numerous cases of doping in cycling – and who had been given a lifetime ban from the sport earlier in the year by the United States Anti-Doping Agency (USADA).

Early life and amateur career

Scarponi was born on 25 September 1979 in the town of Jesi, in the central Italian region of Marche, to Giacomo and Flavia. He spent his childhood in Filottrano, Marche, with brother Marco and sister Silvia. His first bicycle was given to him at his First Communion. He joined the local cycling club Pieralisi aged eight, and began to win races. He was then given a place in the national team at the 1997 UCI Road World Championships in San Sebastián, Spain; he took part in the junior road race, finishing in 104th position.

In April 2001, riding for the Site–Frezza amateur team, Scarponi came second to Yaroslav Popovych in the Giro del Belvedere one-day race. In April–May 2001, he won the fifth stage and came second overall in the Giro delle Regioni, again to Popovych. In October, he participated in the under-23 time trial at the UCI Road World Championships in Lisbon, Portugal, finishing in eighth place, 1 min 32.40 s behind the winner, American Danny Pate.

Professional career

2002–2004: Turning professional

Scarponi turned professional in 2002 with the  team, but they folded at the end of the season. He had taken his first victory with the team, winning a stage at the Settimana Ciclistica Lombarda, en route to a second-place finish overall, and made his debut at a Grand Tour, finishing in eighteenth at the 2002 Giro d'Italia. Scarponi moved to the Domina Vacanze–Elitron team for the 2003 season; he won a stage at the Giro d'Abruzzo, coming third in the final classification, and finished in the top ten of the Amstel Gold Race (seventh) and Liège–Bastogne–Liège (fourth) – both races as part of the 2003 UCI Road World Cup. He again finished in the top twenty at the Giro d'Italia (sixteenth), and finished thirteenth at the Vuelta a España.

Scarponi started the 2004 season with strong performances in the spring Italian stage races; he finished third overall with a stage win at the Settimana Internazionale di Coppi e Bartali, before winning the Settimana Ciclistica Lombarda a couple of weeks later along with two stage wins, the points and mountains classifications. He again competed in all three Ardennes classics, taking fourth place at La Flèche Wallonne, and seventh at Liège–Bastogne–Liège. Forgoing the Giro d'Italia, Scarponi contested the Peace Race; he won the fourth stage in Germany after joining a late-stage move and took the sprint finish in Grünhain-Beierfeld. He maintained the overall lead for the remainder of the race to its finish in Prague. After a second-place finish at the Tour of Austria in June, Scarponi competed in the Tour de France for the first time; he finished in 32nd overall.

2005–2006: Liberty Seguros–Würth

Scarponi moved to the Spanish  team for the 2005 season, and had a quieter season than previous years; he did not win any races, despite his ambitions for the Giro d'Italia. He finished seventh at the Vuelta a Burgos, and recorded his best Grand Tour finish to that point with twelfth at the Vuelta a España, riding largely as a domestique for Roberto Heras, who was initially disqualified after a positive doping test for erythropoietin (EPO), but was later reinstated. In 2006, Scarponi was implicated in the Operación Puerto doping case. This had some consequence on Scarponi's results; his best result was a fifth-place stage finish on the thirteenth stage of the Giro d'Italia, a race he failed to finish for the first time; he failed to start the seventeenth stage the day after his team manager Manolo Saiz was arrested in relation to the Operación.

2007: Acqua & Sapone–Caffè Mokambo

After his late signing, Scarponi did not start his 2007 racing season until March's Clásica de Almería, finishing outside the time limit. He finished fifth at the Vuelta a Murcia and ninth at Tirreno–Adriatico, before moving on to the Settimana Internazionale di Coppi e Bartali. He won the second stage of the race into Faenza after attacking from the peloton with  remaining. He entered the final day two seconds behind race leader Luca Pierfelici, but Pierfelici was dropped; with Scarponi finishing second to Riccardo Riccò in Sassuolo, Scarponi won the race overall by eight seconds ahead of Riccò, who also overhauled Pierfelici on the general classification. After a fourth-place finish at the Giro d'Oro, Scarponi placed second to former teammate Damiano Cunego in the Giro del Trentino, however, that was to be his final race of the season.

Thereafter, Scarponi was once again implicated in the Operación Puerto case. On 1 May, Scarponi met with the Italian National Olympic Committee (CONI) in Rome, regarding his apparent involvement in the Operación. A week later, and a day after his compatriot Ivan Basso confessed to his involvement in Operación Puerto – as the rider codenamed "Birillo" – Scarponi did likewise, confirming that he was both "Zapatero" and "Il Presidente" in another meeting with CONI. On 15 May, CONI requested that both riders be suspended; this request was granted the following day. In July, Scarponi was given an 18-month ban, backdated to 15 May – the day in which CONI had requested Scarponi to be banned – and reduced from the normal two-year suspension due to his cooperation throughout the disciplinary proceedings. In March 2008, following an appeal to the Court of Arbitration for Sport (CAS), the ban was lengthened to 21 months, but at the same time, also taking into effect periods of inactivity by Scarponi; therefore, he was eligible to race again from 1 August.

2008–2010: Diquigiovanni–Androni

With Scarponi completing his ban,  announced in June 2008 that they had signed him for the coming two seasons. He returned to racing at the Giro dell'Appennino on 3 August, and recorded his best result of the 2008 season at the Giro dell'Emilia in October, finishing in seventh position.

2009
In 2009, Scarponi started his season with a fifth-place overall finish at the Vuelta  Andalucía, supporting Davide Rebellin's ultimately unsuccessful bid to win the race. After competing in the Italian Trofeo Laigueglia and Giro di Sardegna races in February, Scarponi moved on to the Tirreno−Adriatico. After a fourth-place finish in the fifth-stage time trial, Scarponi won the sixth stage into Camerino; he had attacked on the climb to the Sassotetto ski resort, and having been brought back to a small group, he managed to outlast Stefano Garzelli and Ivan Basso on the final climb into Camerino, reaching a gradient of 12% in places. He avoided trouble in the final stage, to take his first victory at UCI World Ranking level, 25 seconds ahead of Garzelli.

After contesting the Ardennes classics, Scarponi took aim at the Giro d'Italia, where he was one of the main domestiques for team leader Gilberto Simoni. After some pre-race encouragement from team manager Gianni Savio, Scarponi made it into the breakaway of the day on the sixth stage, which finished over the Italian–Austrian border in Mayrhofen. He also made it into the breakaway on the eighteenth stage; he was one of a septet of riders that broke clear from a larger group of twenty-five riders with  left to race, and they contested a final sprint for the stage win, which Scarponi prevailed in, to take his second win of the Giro d'Italia. He ultimately finished 31st in the final general classification standings. After the Giro d'Italia, Scarponi signed a one-year contract extension with the team until the end of 2010. He contested a series of one-day races during the second half of the season, taking top tens at the Prueba Villafranca de Ordizia (ninth), the Coppa Ugo Agostoni (sixth), and the Gran Premio Industria e Commercio di Prato, where he finished seventh. Scarponi was selected for the UCI Road World Championships in Mendrisio, Switzerland, where he failed to finish the road race.

2010

Scarponi started 2010 with top tens at the Giro di Sardegna (seventh), and ninth at the Classica Sarda in February, before attempting to retain his Tirreno−Adriatico title. He took the race lead with victory in the fourth stage, attacking with Vincenzo Nibali, before later dropping him on the run-in to Chieti. He then lost time to Stefano Garzelli on each of the next two stages held, and went into the final day just two seconds clear. Garzelli's  team were able to lead their captain out to gain a second at each of the stage's two intermediate sprints, and with the stage suited to sprinters, was enough for Garzelli to take the race overall on countback. He finished second in two other stages, as he won overall by 22 seconds ahead of his closest competitor, Riccardo Riccò. In his last warm-up race before the Giro d'Italia, Scarponi finished fourth overall at the Giro del Trentino, missing a podium position by two seconds after Domenico Pozzovivo achieved enough of a gap to overhaul him with victory on the final stage.

Scarponi led a team at a Grand Tour for the first time, leading the  team. After rarely featuring in the first half of the race, Scarponi steadily worked his way up the general classification as the race hit the high mountains. He finished third on successive days, on stage 14 to Monte Grappa, and stage 15 to Monte Zoncolan; on the latter stage, he had been in the lead group until he was distanced by Cadel Evans and Ivan Basso. He remained eighth overall until he took a prestigious victory on stage 19, where he went clear of the field on the Mortirolo Pass with  teammates, Nibali and Basso. Basso was attempting to take the overall lead, so Nibali and him made most of the work during the dangerous descent and subsequent uphill ride to Aprica, leaving Scarponi fresh enough to out sprint the pair. Scarponi moved up to fourth overall as a result; he moved to within a second of the overall podium the following day at the Tonale Pass, but ultimately finished thirteen seconds shy in fourth place, after the final stage individual time trial in Verona. He also finished fourth in the points classification, and fifth in the mountains classification. With the exception of the Brixia Tour and the Vuelta a Burgos, Scarponi contested single-day races for the remainder of the season; he took three podium placings in the autumn, with a third-place finish at the Giro dell'Emilia, and runner-up finishes at the Gran Premio Industria e Commercio di Prato, and also at World Ranking level − in his final ride for  − in the Giro di Lombardia.

2011–2013: Lampre–ISD

2011
Scarponi made his début with the team at the Giro di Sardegna, where he won the final stage after a late attack; he finished in fourth place overall, missing out on the podium by eleven seconds. His next race was Tirreno–Adriatico; he was seen as a contender for the race but not an overall favourite, due to his relatively weak performances in time trials. After losing time in the race-opening team time trial, Scarponi won the fourth stage of the race to Chieti; along with five other riders, he went clear of the field on the final climb and with teammate Damiano Cunego also in the move to control the pace, Scarponi was able to pull further clear and despite fading towards the end, he held on for victory by a few bike lengths ahead of Cunego. He finished third on the penultimate stage, and ultimately finished third overall behind Cadel Evans and Robert Gesink, while also winning the points classification for amassing the highest number of points during stages at intermediate sprints and stage finishes.

Scarponi put in a notable performance at Milan–San Remo, the first Monument classic of the season. With the lead group a minute up the road, after missing a split in the field, Scarponi attacked on the Cipressa and was able to bridge the gap to the lead group. He remained up-front with the group until the finish, where he finished in sixth place – ultimately, his best result in the race. Scarponi then competed in the Volta a Catalunya several days later, finishing second in the overall standings behind Alberto Contador. Prior to the Giro del Trentino, Scarponi trained at altitude at Mount Etna, where his room was searched by Italian police. Scarponi won the Giro del Trentino; he broke clear with Thomas Voeckler on the final climb of the second stage, and the duo remained clear to the end, with Voeckler winning the sprint but Scarponi took the lead overall. He maintained the lead for the rest of the race, winning it for the first time. After the completion of the race, he reconnoitred more stages for Giro d'Italia, studying the stages due to be held in the Dolomites.

In the Giro, after a "satisfying" team time trial by the  team on day one, Scarponi almost won the seventh stage, finishing second to Bart De Clercq by a tyre's length, after trying to chase him down in the final kilometre. The resultant time bonus put him within fourteen seconds of the race lead in fifth place. Scarponi lost time on the ninth stage, the most difficult stage up to that point with the finish at Mount Etna; he had tried to follow an attack by Alberto Contador, but very quickly lost the pace, and ultimately lost 67 seconds to Contador. Commentators felt that Scarponi had been "left wanting both physically and tactically" and paid for his efforts on the climb, but he did remain in fifth place overall.  led the peloton in the closing stages of eleventh stage in anticipation of setting up Scarponi for the stage victory in Castelfidardo; however, John Gadret put in a surprise attack within the final kilometre, and ultimately won the stage. Scarponi finished eighth on the stage, but praised his team, mentioning Alessandro Petacchi in particular, for their hard work at the front of the race for much of the day. He reached the halfway point of the Giro in fifth position, 88 seconds behind race leader Contador.

Scarponi was an early attacker on the first of these, but was unable to make much ground; Contador finished second to José Rujano on the stage, and padded his lead by almost two minutes – Scarponi moved into third overall, trailing by three-and-a-quarter minutes. At the Zoncolan, Scarponi initially followed Igor Antón and Contador up the climb, but was not able to hold onto their pace, and as a result, was overtaken by Nibali, who had approached from the group trailing behind. Scarponi lost another fifty seconds to Contador, and fell to fourth place overall, as Antón moved ahead of him. Scarponi was much closer to Contador on the Gardeccia climb, losing just fourteen seconds; however, he finished well ahead of both Antón and Nibali, and moved into second place in the overall classification. With Contador so far clear, much of the race's focus shifted to the battle for second position between Scarponi and Nibali. The climbing time trial of stage 16 saw Scarponi lose just four seconds to Nibali as he tried to limit his losses ahead of the final stage test against the clock. Nibali closed in by 13 seconds – to 34 seconds – on stage 19, but lost the ground he had gained the following day as he was gapped by the Scarponi–Contador group, losing 22 seconds up to the finish at Sestriere. While a lesser time trialist than Nibali, Scarponi lost only ten seconds over the  distance, comfortably sealing second overall by forty-six seconds; he deemed himself to be "satisfied" with his overall performance over the Giro, despite finishing over six minutes behind Contador.

Scarponi also contested the Vuelta a España later in the season, again leading the  team. He finished second to Joaquim Rodríguez on the eighth stage, but was not a major factor in the general classification; he abandoned on stage 14, trailing the overall leader Bradley Wiggins by over 24 minutes. In February 2012, Contador was stripped of his victories in the Volta a Catalunya and the Giro d'Italia, after a ruling by the Court of Arbitration for Sport (CAS) following his positive test for clenbuterol at the 2010 Tour de France. With Scarponi finishing second in both 2011 races, he was retrospectively promoted to first position.

2012
Scarponi's first stage race of the season was March's Tirreno–Adriatico, where he featured less prominently compared to previous years, finishing seventh overall. Scarponi then moved on to the Tour of the Basque Country, where he was part of the lead group on the final climb of the third stage to Eibar, before fading down to seventh place on the stage. He ultimately finished the race in eighth place overall. Later in April, Scarponi finished sixth in the Giro dell'Appennino, and added another eighth place at Liège–Bastogne–Liège. Having been promoted to the 2011 victory earlier in the year, Scarponi was therefore in a position to defend his Giro d'Italia title in May, leading the  nonet with support from Damiano Cunego as a main domestique.

After losing time in both time trials held within the first four stages, Scarponi advanced on the race's first summit finish – stage seven – at Rocca di Cambio.  held station at the front of the peloton before the climb, with Przemysław Niemiec protecting Scarponi, before Scarponi made an attack on the climb, with 's Paolo Tiralongo going with him; Scarponi held the lead until the final corner, when Tiralongo came around the outside of him, to take the victory. Scarponi moved into the top ten of the overall classification definitively after stage 14, and worked his way into the top five three stages later, with a sixth-place finish on stage 17. Scarponi was one of a lead group of six riders that remained on the Giau Pass; he was dropped towards the top of the climb along with Rigoberto Urán, but they both made it back into the lead group on the descent into Cortina d'Ampezzo. He ultimately finished the stage in fourth place, but moved up to third overall.

The race's penultimate stage, was also its queen stage; five categorised climbs were on the parcours, the last two of which being the first-category Mortirolo Pass and the Cima Coppi super-category Stelvio Pass, where the stage finished atop. On the Stelvio, Ryder Hesjedal lifted the pace to such an intensity that only Joaquim Rodríguez and Scarponi could follow. Inside the final , Scarponi launched forward, and was closely followed by Rodríguez, with no movement from Hesjedal. Rodríguez managed to catch and pass Scarponi for fourth on the stage, but with Thomas De Gendt closing in by nearly four minutes after winning the stage, Scarponi held an advantage of just under half a minute, going into the final time trial. De Gendt was expected to take the podium placing due to him being more proficient in the discipline than Scarponi. De Gendt was first to take to the stage, recording a time of 34' 07" – good enough for a fifth-place stage finish – and was more than enough to move ahead of Scarponi, who recorded a time of exactly 35 minutes. Therefore, Scarponi finished fourth overall with Hesjedal taking the overall win.

After the Giro d'Italia, Scarponi signed a one-year extension to his contract – signing until the end of the 2013 season – before he then decided to focus on the Tour de France, a race he had not contested since 2004. Scarponi lost over two minutes on the sixth stage, after being delayed by an incident that became known as the "Metz Massacre", where numerous riders hit the tarmac. Trailing by over ten minutes after the ninth stage time trial, Scarponi featured in the following day's breakaway. After the group broke apart on the Col du Grand Colombier, Scarponi was one of five riders that remained clear to the end of the stage, but finished second behind Thomas Voeckler at the finish in Bellegarde-sur-Valserine. Scarponi was not a factor in the second part of the race, and ultimately finished in 24th overall, almost an hour down on winner Bradley Wiggins.

Scarponi was temporarily suspended by his team in November 2012 after he admitted performing tests with Michele Ferrari, a doctor whose name has been linked to numerous cases of doping in cycling. His salary at the time was disclosed, which was €700,000 a year. The Italian National Olympic Committee (CONI) requested a three-month ban for Scarponi, along with Giovanni Visconti, for working with Ferrari; this was finalised on 12 December 2012, along with a €10,000 fine, backdated to 1 October 2012. This meant that Scarponi was able to race again from the start of the 2013 season.

2013

Despite being cleared to race, Scarponi did not start his season until the very end of February, finishing tenth at the Gran Premio Città di Camaiore. He had two placings inside the top ten at Paris–Nice, before moving on to the Volta a Catalunya. Scarponi had been fifth going into the final stage in Barcelona, but he bridged across a 20-second gap to reach three race leaders. There, he remained and ultimately finished the stage in fourth position; a 21-second gap to the peloton enabled him to move up two places into third overall, passing Nairo Quintana and Bradley Wiggins. After contesting the Giro del Trentino, Scarponi continued his warmup to the Giro d'Italia with his fourth top-ten finish at Liège–Bastogne–Liège, finishing in fifth place after missing in a sprint with Alejandro Valverde and Carlos Betancur.

He then focused on the Giro d'Italia where he again led . He only breached the top ten in stage results once during the first half of the race, but never dropped lower than sixth after the eighth stage; he ultimately finished fourth overall, the same place as he finished in 2010 and 2012. After competing in the Tour de Suisse, Scarponi went on to compete in the National Road Race Championships, held on the course of the Trofeo Melinda. Scarponi was part of a three-man move that stayed clear until the end of the race, along with Ivan Santaromita and Davide Rebellin; Scarponi was able to get the better of Rebellin in the finish, but was out-sprinted by Santaromita who went on to win the tricolour jersey. Scarponi then continued his progression towards the Vuelta a España, by competing in the Tour de Pologne.

Scarponi finished 15th overall in the Vuelta a España, taking a best stage placing of second on the fifteenth stage at Peyragudes; he had been part of a 28-man breakaway, and was one of two riders to successfully remain clear of the peloton – he finished more than three minutes down on stage winner Alexandre Geniez. Scarponi was selected for the UCI Road World Championships in Florence, Italy, where he finished sixteenth – and second-best Italian behind Vincenzo Nibali – in the road race.

2014–2017: Astana

For the 2014 season, Scarponi moved to the  squad, signing an initial one-year contract. His first race with the team was at January's Tour de San Luis, before recording top ten finishes in three stage races during the spring: he was ninth at both the Vuelta a Andalucía and Tirreno–Adriatico, and finished a place higher at the Giro del Trentino. He was selected as the team leader for the Giro d'Italia, and was named as one of the pre-race favourites for the general classification; Scarponi was "optimistic" of his chances at the race. He crashed on stage six, losing almost two minutes, and he lost another ten minutes two stages later, as the team leadership started to move towards Fabio Aru; Scarponi ultimately withdrew from the race on stage sixteen. At the Tour de France, he was a key domestique for the overall winner, Vincenzo Nibali.

Scarponi remained with  into the 2015 season. He led the squad at the Tour of the Basque Country, where he finished sixth overall, as well as finishing two stages in sixth place. He and Nibali both took part in the Tour de Romandie, where Scarponi just missed out on a top ten overall result – to Nibali – by eight seconds. At the Tour de France he again rode in support of Nibali, who placed fourth overall. At the Vuelta a Burgos, he was part of the squad that won the team time trial on the second stage, and with two other fourth-place stage finishes, Scarponi finished in second place overall, two seconds behind teammate Rein Taaramäe.

He again started his season at the Tour de San Luis, before moving on to the spring Italian stage races. He failed to finish Tirreno–Adriatico, failing to start the final time trial stage after fracturing his collarbone the previous day. He missed a month of racing as the injury healed, and returned to competition at the Giro del Trentino.  won the race-opening time trial, and Scarponi was mainly used as a domestique, with Tanel Kangert winning the final two stages in the race. Scarponi ultimately finished the race fourteenth overall. At the Giro d'Italia, he was a key domestique for the overall winner Vincenzo Nibali, helping him come from nearly five minutes down in the overall classification, to win the race by 52 seconds from Esteban Chaves. He competed in the Tour de Suisse, before a mid-summer break, where he announced another 12-month contract extension for 2017. As a warm-up for the Vuelta a España, Scarponi competed at the Vuelta a Burgos, where as they had done in 2015,  won the team time trial. Scarponi led his team at the Vuelta a España, taking three top ten stage finishes, but missed out on a top ten placing overall, finishing in eleventh place.

Scarponi started the 2017 season by competing in the Volta a la Comunitat Valenciana and Volta ao Algarve races in February, finishing in the top twenty of them both. He then contested Tirreno–Adriatico, finishing fifteenth overall, before moving on to the Tour of the Alps, the successor to the Giro del Trentino with its additional foray into Austria. On the opening stage, Scarponi formed part of an elite group that had moved clear on the final climb in Hungerburg, Austria. Scarponi had the strongest finish, as he out-sprinted the remaining members of the group, taking his first individual victory since his 2013 Gran Premio della Costa Etruschi success. He finished the race in fourth position overall.

Death
On 22 April 2017, and having completed the Tour of the Alps the day before, Scarponi was on a training ride for that year's Giro d'Italia – where he was due to lead the  team, after Fabio Aru withdrew due to injury. At around 08:00 local time, Scarponi was riding along the SP 362 provincial road (Via dell'Industria),  from the centre of his home town of Filottrano, when he was hit at a road junction (via Schiavoni) by an Iveco Daily van, driven by 57-year-old local craftsman Giuseppe Giacconi. According to statements made to the carabinieri (Italian police), Giacconi did not see Scarponi. He was known to Scarponi's father Giacomo, who said: "We know each other well. I've lost a son, but I'm thinking of him too." The criminal investigation culminated in mid-February 2018, after Giacconi died of cancer.

In the days following Scarponi's death, tributes were made for him at professional races, first at the Tour of Croatia the next day with a minute's silence, and then at Liège–Bastogne–Liège the day after with a round of applause. In both races riders wore black armbands. Alejandro Valverde won Liège–Bastogne–Liège and gave his prize money to Scarponi's family. Former teammate and close friend Vincenzo Nibali dedicated his overall victory of the Tour of Croatia to Scarponi. A minute's silence was also observed before the Juventus–Genoa Serie A football match in Turin. His funeral took place on 25 April at Filottrano's football stadium, attended by an estimated 5,000 mourners. The service was officiated by cardinal Edoardo Menichelli.

On 30 April 2017, it was announced that  would ride the Giro d'Italia with only eight riders, in honour of Scarponi. The Giro d'Italia dedicated stage sixteen's Mortirolo Pass climb – which played a part in his final stage victory of the race in 2010 – to Scarponi, giving the rider who passes first double points in the mountains classification. In September, Peter Sagan dedicated his victory in the World Road Race Championships to Scarponi. In January 2018, it was announced that March's Tirreno–Adriatico was to include a stage finish in his home town of Filottrano. Scarponi was further remembered at the 2022 Giro d'Italia – at the site of Scarponi's death, a mural was unveiled of his pet parrot, who would normally accompany Scarponi on his training rides.

Personal life
Scarponi was married to Anna Tommasi, with whom he had twin boys, Giacomo and Tommaso.

Major results
Source:

1997
 1st  Road race, National Junior Road Championships
 3rd Grand Prix Rüebliland
2001
 1st Memorial Danilo Furlan
 2nd Overall Giro delle Regioni
1st Stage 5
 2nd Giro del Belvedere
 4th Trofeo Banca Popolare di Vicenza
 8th Time trial, UCI Under-23 Road World Championships
2002
 1st Stage 4 Giro del Trentino
 2nd Overall Settimana Ciclistica Lombarda
1st Stage 3b (ITT)
 8th Overall Settimana Internazionale di Coppi e Bartali
2003
 1st Gran Premio Fred Mengoni
 3rd Overall Giro d'Abruzzo
1st  Points classification
1st Stage 3
 4th Liège–Bastogne–Liège
 6th Overall Settimana Internazionale di Coppi e Bartali
 7th Amstel Gold Race
 9th Züri-Metzgete
2004
 1st  Overall Settimana Ciclistica Lombarda
1st  Points classification
1st  Mountains classification
1st Stages 1 & 2
 1st  Overall Peace Race
1st Stage 4
 2nd Overall Tour of Austria
 3rd Overall Settimana Internazionale di Coppi e Bartali
1st Stage 4
 4th La Flèche Wallonne
 7th Liège–Bastogne–Liège
2005
 7th Overall Vuelta a Burgos
2006
 6th Overall Vuelta a Castilla y León
2007
 1st  Overall Settimana Internazionale di Coppi e Bartali
1st Stage 2
 2nd Overall Giro del Trentino
 4th Giro d'Oro
 5th Overall Vuelta a Murcia
 9th Overall Tirreno–Adriatico
2008
 7th Giro dell'Emilia
2009
 1st  Overall Tirreno–Adriatico
1st Stage 6
 Giro d'Italia
1st Stages 6 & 18
 5th Overall Vuelta a Andalucía
 6th Coppa Ugo Agostoni
 7th Gran Premio Industria e Commercio di Prato
 9th Prueba Villafranca de Ordizia
2010
 1st  Overall Settimana Ciclistica Lombarda
1st Prologue
 2nd Overall Tirreno–Adriatico
1st Stage 4
 2nd Giro di Lombardia
 2nd Gran Premio Industria e Commercio di Prato
 3rd Giro dell'Emilia
 4th Overall Giro d'Italia
1st Stage 19
 4th Overall Giro del Trentino
 7th Overall Giro di Sardegna
 9th Classica Sarda
 10th Coppa Ugo Agostoni
 10th Giro di Toscana
2011
 1st  Overall Giro d'Italia
1st  Points classification
 1st  Overall Volta a Catalunya
1st Stage 3
 1st  Overall Giro del Trentino
 3rd Overall Tirreno–Adriatico
1st  Points classification
1st Stage 4
 4th UCI World Tour
 4th Overall Giro di Sardegna
1st Stage 5
 6th Milan–San Remo
2012
 4th Overall Giro d'Italia
 6th Giro dell'Appennino
 7th Overall Tirreno–Adriatico
 8th Overall Tour of the Basque Country
 8th Liège–Bastogne–Liège
2013
 1st Gran Premio della Costa Etruschi
 2nd Road race, National Road Championships
 3rd Overall Volta a Catalunya
 4th Overall Giro d'Italia
 5th Liège–Bastogne–Liège
 8th Giro dell'Emilia
 10th Gran Premio Città di Camaiore
2014
 8th Overall Giro del Trentino
 9th Overall Vuelta a Andalucía
 9th Overall Tirreno–Adriatico
2015
 2nd Overall Vuelta a Burgos
1st Stage 2 (TTT)
 6th Overall Tour of the Basque Country
2016
 1st Stage 1 (TTT) Giro del Trentino
 1st Stage 2 (TTT) Vuelta a Burgos
2017
 4th Overall Tour of the Alps
1st Stage 1

General classification results timeline
Source:

Monuments results timeline
Source:

Notes

References

External links

 

1979 births
2017 deaths
Italian male cyclists
Doping cases in cycling
People from Iesi
Italian Giro d'Italia stage winners
Giro d'Italia winners
Sportspeople from the Province of Ancona
Italian sportspeople in doping cases
Cycling road incident deaths
Road incident deaths in Italy
Cyclists from Marche